Thine Eyes Bleed is a Canadian melodic death metal band from London, Ontario.

History
Thine Eyes Bleed took part in a US tour in 2004.
They released their first album In the Wake of Separation in 2005.

Johnny Araya's brother Tom Araya is the bassist and vocalist of the thrash metal band Slayer. The two bands were featured on 2006's The Unholy Alliance tour, along with Lamb of God, Mastodon and Children of Bodom, and the 2007 Canadian tour.

In April 2008, Thine Eyes Bleed released their follow up album, Thine Eyes Bleed.

Justin Wolfe later became a chef and opened his own restaurant with his brother Gregg.

Recent events
They performed as the opening act of Slayer's The Unholy Alliance tour in the summer of 2006 in North America, and in autumn in Europe.

Thine Eyes Bleed was managed by Morgan and Mercedes Lander's parents. Their father Dave Lander died of a heart attack on August 2, 2008.

Band members

Current members 
 Justin Wolfe – lead vocals (2002–present)
 Jeff Phillips - guitars, backing vocals (2002–present)
 Darryl Stephens – drums (2002–present)
 Johnny Araya - bass (2004–present)

Former members 
 Luke Husband – bass (2002-2004)
 David Newell – guitars (2002-2004)
 Derek Ward – guitars (2004–2006)
 Ryan Tunne - guitars (2006)
 James Reid – guitars (2006-2010)
 Nigel Curley – guitars (2010–2011)

Timeline

Discography
 In the Wake of Separation (2005)
 Thine Eyes Bleed (2008)
 The Embers Rise (2011)

References

External links

 Profile on Encyclopaedia Metallum
 Profile on Capitale du Metal

2002 establishments in Ontario
Canadian melodic death metal musical groups
Canadian thrash metal musical groups
Musical groups established in 2002
Musical groups from London, Ontario
Musical quintets